Dedunu Silva (born 12 February 1978) is a Sri Lankan cricketer.
In January 2023, she was named as one of the on-field umpires for the 2023 ICC Under-19 Women's T20 World Cup.

References

1978 births
Living people
Sri Lankan women cricketers
Sri Lanka women One Day International cricketers
Sri Lanka women Twenty20 International cricketers
Cricketers from Colombo
Marians women cricketers
Slimline Sport Club women cricketers